Almudena Gracia Manzano (born 14 September 1969), known artistically as Malena Gracia, is a Spanish actress, singer, dancer, vedette, and pin-up model. She is best known for having obtained a triple platinum certification for her song "Loca", with more than 300,000 copies sold. She has also appeared on television series with high ratings.

Career
Malena Gracia has worked in film, television, music, theater, and advertising. She has been a model and appeared in several magazines and Spanish TV programs. She was discovered by director and producer Valeriu Lazarov. She was a student at the Daniel Cicaret dance school. She studied solfège, singing, and acting with Luis Arnedillo and the professor of the Madrid Royal Conservatory, Inés Rivadeneira. Later she continued her classes with José Sepúlveda, at Ángela Carrasco's school, specializing in musicals. She shared a singing teacher with Shaila Dúrcal. Her early years in the world of dance and entertainment were not easy; her family was of humble origins and for seven years she was a victim of mistreatment of one of her ex-partners.

During the 1990s, Gracia worked on various television shows and began a musical career, as a singer of copla and Spanish songs, studying with maestro Julián Bazán. In 1992 she released her first Spanish song album Vete con él. Her style would later change to pop, although she always aspired to be a lyric singer.

Her television popularity grew on shows like De lo bueno el mejor and in sketches on the popular Antena 3 program Arévalo & cia, a Spanish adaptation of The Benny Hill Show. She participated in the first chapters of Hostal Royal Manzanares with Lina Morgan, a series that obtained audience levels of 46% and 8,500,000 spectators for its premiere. She also gained notoriety in the tabloid press. She presented Pase lo que pase on Telemadrid with Catalan comedian . She also participated in several Christmas specials on Telecinco with Lina Morgan.

In 1998 was chosen Playboy's European covergirl. She has posed nude or seminude for the magazines Playboy, Man, and Interviú (she appeared on seven occasions, one of them posing with Yola Berrocal).

Gracia had a romantic relationship with lawyer Emilio Rodríguez Menéndez, who was sentenced to nine years and six months in prison for fraud against the Public Treasury. After their breakup she suffered strong harassment and media persecution by the lawyer. In the year 2000, Malena Gracia filed a defamation lawsuit against his magazine Dígame, through which she obtained a judicial order to seize the magazine. The singer requested help from the  detective agency, which cooperated with the police to arrest him in 2005 in Argentina for having escaped to Paraguay to avoid the condemnation of the Spanish justice system. According to Gracia, the lawyer blackmailed her knowing that in the past she had briefly engaged in prostitution.

Two years after the separation of Sex Bomb, Malena joined the popular reality series , where she was third finalist, and thanks to this she was able to get funding to start her musical career, with various summer and dance songs.

2003 saw the market launch of her successful song "Loca" on the Vale Music label. It achieved high levels of popularity on the radio and at events in Spain. Due to its high sales volume, it reached triple platinum status, becoming the quintessential song of that summer, was played for more than a decade in Spain, and was published in several compilations.

Its run only lasted three days, and it was later discovered to have been financed by the Gürtel plot, with €481,000 supplied by Francisco Correa Sánchez and his partner "El Bigotes".

Malena Gracia has tried to represent Spain in the Eurovision Song Contest on several occasions. She was presented to the Spanish preselection of 2008 with the song "Un poquito más", but was passed over in favor of Rodolfo Chikilicuatre. In 2009 she tried with "Quiero volar". In 2010 she once again presented her candidacy for the Spanish Eurovision preselection with her song "La Vida".

Among other reality TV appearances, she was the fourth finalist on the 2010 season of Supervivientes. This edition featured both famous and unknown contestants, with Gracia being the last famous one to be voted off.

In April 2012, she appealed on television regarding the possible abduction of her sister at birth. She was born prematurely on 30 August 1960, and for that reason she was taken to the Hospital Clínico San Carlos to gain weight in an incubator. The family went to see her on several occasions, but on the twelfth day they were told that she had died, without allowing the parents to see the body, which was consistent with procedures carried out in the kidnapping of children in Francoist Spain.

In March 2015 she presented her new album Miénteme on the Telecinco network, becoming a trending topic on Twitter.

In February 2016 she was romantically linked in the press with the well-known humorist , a friend of the artist for over 20 years. Arévalo lost his wife in December 2015, and the story was later denied by both, which caused discomfort in the comedian for confusing a deep friendship.

In 2016, she was part of the cast of a theatrical adaptation of the 1962 film Atraco a las tres, directed by José María Forqué, premiered on 5 March at the Federico García Lorca Theater in Getafe. The play toured several venues, including the Carlos III Royal Theater of Aranjuez. In May 2016, she announced in the press that she was experiencing financial difficulties due to the death of her mother on Christmas 2015.

Acting roles

Films

Dramatic TV series

Other TV series

Presenter
 Presentadora de Playboy TV (1998/1999)
 Marca y Gana on Cuatro TV (2011/2012)

Collaborations
 De lo bueno, lo mejor as flight attendant (1995/1996)
 Mamma Mia on Telemadrid as occasional contributor (2000/2002)
 Crónicas Marcianas on Telecinco as occasional contributor (2002/2005)
  on Telecinco as occasional contributor (2005/2006)
  on Telecinco as occasional contributor (2007)
 Oh la la as contributor (2007/2008)
  on Telecinco as occasional contributor (2009)
  on Telecinco as occasional contributor (2009)
  on LaSiete as reporter (2010)

Specials
 Especial año nuevo 1994 on Telecinco
 Especial navidad 1995 on La 1, together with Lina Morgan
 Viaja con nosotros, together with Javier Gurruchaga (1996)
 Diario de... la cirugía estética, presented by Mercedes Milá (2005)
 21 Días Cómo convertirse en famoso on Canal Cuatro, with Adela Úcar (2010)
 Sálvame Stars on Telecinco, year-end special presented with Jorge Javier Vázquez (2017–2018)

Contests and reality shows
 Mañana serán estrellas on Telecinco, 2nd place (1993)
 El trampolín, 1st place (1993)
 Nuevos valores, 1st place (1994)
 El Super Trampolín, 1st place (1994)
  on Telecinco, 3rd finalist (2003)
 Supervivientes on Telecinco, 4th finalist (2010)

Theater
 Theater Company of Ricardo Hurtado (1982/1986)
  by Miguel Mihura (1988)
 El canto de la cigarra by Alfonso Paso (1989)
  by Alan Ayckbourn (2000)
  by Alfonso Paso (2001/2002)
 Tres mujeres sin punto com (2012)
 Que descanse en paz, pero que lo haga ya (2013)
 Prohibido seducir a los casados (2014)
 Dos en apuros (2015/2016)
 Atraco a las tres by Carlos Pardo García (2016)

Musicals
 Con ellos llegó la risa, together with María Isbert (1996)
 Loca por ti, show of her own creation (1998)
 Atrévete, show of her own creation (1999/2001)
 Canción del Olvido (2015)

Other events
 Representative of Spain at the first Playboy Congress of 1999 on the island of Rhodes, Greece
 Performance at Dancing Queen Barcelona 2007
 Proclaimer of the 2007 festivals of Santa Cruz de Retamar (Toledo)
 Gay Pride Day Parade in Madrid almost every year
 Proclaimer of Gay Pride 2008
 Candidate to represent Spain at the Eurovision Song Contest three consecutive years (2008, 2009, 2010)

Discography

Albums

Singles

EPs

Additional
 B.S.O. Hotel Glam, 2003

References

External links
 
 

1971 births
20th-century Spanish actresses
21st-century Spanish actresses
20th-century Spanish singers
21st-century Spanish singers
Actresses from Madrid
Living people
Singers from Madrid
Spanish female adult models
Spanish film actresses
Spanish women pop singers
Spanish television actresses
Survivor (franchise) contestants
20th-century Spanish women singers
21st-century Spanish women singers